is a Japanese light novel series written by Ichika Isshiki and illustrated by fame. Isshiki started publishing the series on the user-generated novel publishing website Shōsetsuka ni Narō in January 2017 and it was later moved to Kakuyomu in March 2022. The first novel volume was released in November 2017. A manga adaptation, illustrated by Daisuke Takino, started in Micro Magazine's online magazine Comic Ride in March 2018. An anime television series adaptation is set to premiere in 2023.

Plot
Fate Graphite a gate keeper who works for a noble family and gets humiliated because he has a useless skill. Later He kills a bandit and discovers that his skill Gluttony has a concealed ability that allows him to steal skills and grow stronger. From here he leaves the noble family he works for and begin his journey to grow stronger to get back at those who humiliated him. while also discovering sinister secrets linked to his skill and his family's lineage with his friends Roxy, Mine and Eris also his adoptive father Aaron.

Characters

Media

Light novel
Written by Ichika Isshiki, Berserk of Gluttony started on the user-generated novel publishing website Shōsetsuka ni Narō on January 24, 2017. Isshiki published the 218th and last chapter on Shōsetsuka ni Narō in March 2022 and the series was then transferred to Kakuyomu. As of October 28, 2022, eight volumes have been released.

In North America, Seven Seas Entertainment announced that they had licensed the novels in July 2020.

Manga
A manga adaptation, illustrated by Daisuke Takino, started on Micro Magazine's online magazine Comic Ride on March 1, 2018. Micro Magazine released the first tankōbon volume on September 28, 2018. As of October 31, 2022, nine volumes have been released.

In North America, Seven Seas Entertainment announced that they had licensed the manga in July 2020.

Anime
In October 2022, it was announced that the series would receive an anime television series adaptation. It is set to premiere in 2023.

References

External links
  at Kakuyomu 
  
  
 

2017 Japanese novels
Anime and manga based on light novels
Dark fantasy anime and manga
Japanese webcomics
Light novels
Light novels first published online
Seinen manga
Seven Seas Entertainment titles
Shōsetsuka ni Narō
Upcoming anime television series
Webcomics in print